The Ardvreck Group is a stratigraphic group of early Cambrian age found in the Northwest Highlands of Scotland. It lies unconformably on gneisses of the Lewisian complex or sandstones of the Torridonian Supergroup. It consists of two formations, the basal quartzites and quartz arenites of the Eriboll Formation and the overlying dolomitic siltstones and sandstones and quartz arenites of the An-t-Sron Formation. It is overlain conformably by the  Ghrudaidh Formation of the Durness Group. The Ardvreck Group was at one time known as the "Eriboll Group".

References

Geological groups of the United Kingdom
Geology of Scotland
Cambrian